Woodlawn Park is a town in Oklahoma County, Oklahoma, United States, and a part of the Oklahoma City Metropolitan Area. The population was 161 at the 2000 census.

History
An incorporated town in Oklahoma County, Woodlawn Park is one of several urban islands surrounded by other towns of the Oklahoma City metropolitan area. Woodlawn Park lies within the city of Bethany, which is itself surrounded by Oklahoma City. Originally the area was the farm of Frank Levi Braniger, who acquired land in Council Grove Township with, or soon after, the Land Run of 1889. In 1923 one of Braniger's sons subdivided a heavily wooded part of the property into residential lots. This became Woodlawn Park, a rectangle of .128 square miles (approximately eighty-one acres), measuring one-half mile east–west and one-quarter mile north–south. It is bounded by Council Road on the west, Glade Avenue on the east, NW 36th Street on the south, and NW 39th Street on the north. Within the boundaries, between NW 37th and NW 38th streets lies a long park, the center of the town. A few homes were constructed in the late 1920s, but most of the development occurred in the late 1940s and through the 1950s.

Incorporation was accomplished in July 1952 as Bethany began to envelop the neighborhood. The 1960 census recorded 129 inhabitants. Woodlawn Park's large lots were gradually sold, and housing construction continued into the 1990s. After peaking at 220 residents in 1970, the community's population declined to 161 in 2000. The town supports no commercial development. A board of trustees is elected, but city services are provided by Bethany and Oklahoma County. Most residents are employed in management and the professions, and all work in the surrounding metropolitan area. http://digital.library.okstate.edu/encyclopedia/entries/W/WO012.html

Geography

Demographics

As of the census of 2000, there were 161 people, 75 households, and 48 families residing in the town. There were 77 housing units at an average density of 600.9 per square mile (228.7/km2). The racial makeup of the town was 93.79% White, 1.24% Native American, 0.62% Asian, and 4.35% from two or more races.

There were 75 households, out of which 20.0% had children under the age of 18 living with them, 61.3% were married couples living together, 1.3% had a female householder with no husband present, and 36.0% were non-families. 34.7% of all households were made up of individuals, and 20.0% had someone living alone who was 65 years of age or older. The average household size was 2.15 and the average family size was 2.75.

In the town, the population was spread out, with 18.0% under the age of 18, 3.7% from 18 to 24, 13.0% from 25 to 44, 39.1% from 45 to 64, and 26.1% who were 65 years of age or older. The median age was 51 years. For every 100 females, there were 109.1 males. For every 100 females age 18 and over, there were 88.6 males.

The median income for a household in the town was $46,806, and the median income for a family was $58,750. Males had a median income of $46,250 versus $33,333 for females. The per capita income for the town was $43,376. About 6.0% of families and 5.6% of the population were below the poverty line, including none of those under the age of 18 and 8.3% of those 65 or over.

References

Oklahoma City metropolitan area
Towns in Oklahoma County, Oklahoma
Towns in Oklahoma
Enclaves in the United States